Ntshangase is a South African surname. Notable people with the surname include:

Luyanda Ntshangase (1997–2018), South African football player
Phumlani Ntshangase (born 1994), South African football midfielder 
Siphelele Ntshangase (born 1993), South African football player 
Bridget Ntshangase (died 2021), South African politician 

Surnames of African origin